Claude Louis Séraphin Barizain (December 6, 1783 – 1843) was a French actor, known as Monrose.

He was born in Besançon, and was already playing children's parts at the time of the Revolution.

He was called to the Comédie-Française in 1815, and was received sociétaire in 1817. A small, active man, with mobile and expressive features and quick, nervous gestures, he was noted as the rascally servant in such plays as Le Barbier de Séville and Les Fourberies de Scapin.

His son, Louis Martial Barizain (1811–1883), also called Monrose, was also an actor. He succeeded Joseph Isidore Samson as professor at the Conservatoire in 1866.

Notes

References
 Base documentaire La Grange sur le site de la Comédie-Française
 

Actors from Besançon
1783 births
1843 deaths
19th-century French male actors
Sociétaires of the Comédie-Française